Thomas Jefferson High School is historic high school in Richmond, Virginia. It is part of the Richmond Public Schools. The Art Deco building, constructed in 1929 and opened in 1930, has been listed on the U.S. National Register of Historic Places.  It was designed by architect Charles M. Robinson.  In his book, "The Virginia Landmarks Register," Calder Loth refers to the school as Robinson's "masterpiece" and notes that the structure is "a celebration of education, a building redolent of civic pride."

References

External links

National Register of Historic Places in Richmond, Virginia
Art Deco architecture in Virginia
School buildings completed in 1929
School buildings on the National Register of Historic Places in Virginia
Public high schools in Virginia
High schools in Richmond, Virginia
1929 establishments in Virginia